Waupaca may refer to a city and a town in Waupaca County, Wisconsin:

 Waupaca, Wisconsin, a city
 Waupaca (town), Wisconsin, a town